JSM may refer to:

Media and publications
 Joseph Smith—Matthew, a book of the Pearl of Great Price of the Latter Day Saint movement
 Journal for the Academic Study of Magic
 Journal of Sexual Medicine, a peer-reviewed academic journal
 Just Shoot Me!, an American television sitcom

People
 John Stuart Mill (1806–1873), British philosopher, political economist, and politician
 Josie Maran (Johanna Selhorst "Josie" Maran), American supermodel and actress

Sports
 JSM Béjaïa, a football club in Béjaïa, Algeria
 JSM Chéraga,  a football club in Chéraga, Algeria
 JSM Tiaret,  a football club in Tiaret, Algeria
 Al Shabiba Mazraa Beirut, also known as JS Mazraa, a football club in Mazraa, Lebanon

Other
 The Japanese School of Melbourne
 Joint Statistical Meetings, a conference of statisticians in North America
 Joint Strike Missile, an improved version of the Norwegian anti-ship Naval Strike Missile
 Johnson Stokes & Master, one of the oldest law firms in Asia
 John Smith Monument, built to commemorate John Smith's visit
 Juris Scientiae Magister (Master of the Science of Laws), a postgraduate law degree awarded by Stanford University and other institutions
 Javascript Module. Modules have been added to JavaScript in ES2015, see also Asynchronous module definition